Hadrokirus is an extinct genus of true seal (Phocidae) that lived on the coast of Peru and North Carolina about 6 million years ago. The type species, H. martini, was found in the Pisco Formation, together with other marine animals such as crustaceans, sharks, coastal birds, whales and aquatic sloths. It is assumed that Hadrokirus martini was durophagous; its diet probably comprised crustaceans, small bivalves and other shelled animals, similar to that of the living sea otter. The living seals most closely related to Hadrokirus are the Antarctic seals.

References

Bibliography 
 

Lobodontins
Miocene pinnipeds
Prehistoric carnivoran genera
†Hadrokirus
Miocene mammals of South America
Neogene Peru
Fossils of Peru
Pisco Formation
Fossil taxa described in 2013